Phoenix New City or Phoenix New Town is a special district of Tangshan, China that developed as its central business district.

Economy

Taking advantage of its good ecological environment, Phoenix New City, which is under construction, aims at the domestic first-class CBD development standards. Sixty-eight key projects are comprehensively promoted with a total investment of 63.5 billion yuan.

Different from the traditional expansion type of many cities, Phoenix New City aims at the highest town planning standards in developed countries from the very beginning with commercial, administrative, culture, and green land axes co-existing. "Eco-oriented", "new urbanism", "smart growth" and other advanced international concepts were introduced into the construction to build the domestic first class central business district with eco-tourism and leisure, business services, financial center, the headquarters base, high technology, creative cultural industries, etc.

In accordance with the strategy of inviting business (focusing on inviting global business and strategic investors to improve core competitiveness) which was brought up in early 2010, the Administrative Committee of Tangshan Phoenix New City targeted at Fortune 500 companies home and abroad to carry out a variety of effective activities to invite business, which achieved remarkable results. In 2010, Tangshan received 200 batches of Chinese and foreign visiting groups. Among these groups, 11 are from global Fortune 500 enterprises, 16 are from China fortune 500 enterprises, and 15 are from China's top 500 private enterprises and top 100 specialized enterprises.

Among these projects, the residential and commercial projects co-developed by Hong Kong Kerry Group and China Resources Land Group, as well as the residential and commercial projects co-developed by China Water Power Group and China Petroleum Jidong Oil Company started construction. The South Korean Lotte urban complex project and Pangda Automobile Trade Group Jidong Material Building project reached an agreement with the administrative committee and will start construction in 2011. Yicheng Group urban complex project and Beijing Wanke real estate project will be started soon.

See also
Binhai New Area (Tianjin)
Beijing CBD
Central, Hong Kong
Nishi-shinjuku (Tokyo)
Bankenviertel (Frankfurt am Main)
La Defense (Paris)
City of London (London)
Manhattan (New York)
Singapore CBD
Financial District (Toronto)
Chicago Loop

External links
 Tangshan government website
 Latest Tangshan news

Special Economic Zones of China
Central business districts